Jack Anderson (29 October 1908 – 25 May 1958) was an Australian rules footballer who played in the Victorian Football League (VFL) between 1932 and 1933 for the Richmond Football Club and from 1935 to 1939 for the North Melbourne Football Club. Jack Anderson is the father of former radio announcer John Anderson

References

Hogan P: The Tigers Of Old, Richmond FC, Melbourne 1996

1908 births
1958 deaths
Richmond Football Club players
Richmond Football Club Premiership players
North Melbourne Football Club players
Traralgon Football Club players
Australian rules footballers from Victoria (Australia)
One-time VFL/AFL Premiership players